Steven Herrick (born in Brisbane, 1958) is an Australian poet and author. Herrick has published twenty-six books for adults, young adults and children. He is widely regarded as a pioneer of verse-novels for children and young adults.

Herrick was born the youngest of seven children. His first published poem, written at age eighteen, was called Love is like a gobstopper.
He left school in year 10. He studied poetry at university, and gained his B.A. from the University of Queensland in 1982.

In 1984, he moved to Sydney and spent time performing his poems in the pubs and clubs of the inner-city, often as a support act for local bands. Soon after he was approached by Mighty Boy Records to record an independent record of his poetry, titled 'The Esoteric Herrick'. This record gained airplay on alternate music radio stations and was quickly followed by the release of his second record, 'The Herrick Manifesto.'

In 1994, he moved with his wife and children to his current home in the Blue Mountains and began writing books for children and young adults.

His books have won the NSW Premier's Literary Awards in 2000 and 2005 and have been on the Children's Book Council of Australia "Children's Book of the Year Awards" shortlist multiple times, including 1997 - "Love, Ghosts and Nose Hair"; 1999 - "A Place like This"; 2001 - "The Simple Gift"; 2003 - "Tom Jones Saves the World"; 2013 - "Pookie Aleera is not my boyfriend"; 2015 - "Bleakboy and Hunter Stand out in the Rain"; 2019 - "The Bogan Mondrian"; 2022 - “How to Repaint a Life”, and have been recognised as an Honour Book in 2004 - "Do-wrong Ron" and 2005 - "By the River".

His books for children and young adults have been translated into numerous languages and are regularly set on school text lists in his native Australia. In 2019, the German translation of "by the river" won both the German Catholic Book of the Year Award and the prestigious German Youth Literature Award at the Frankfurt Book Fair.

He regularly visits schools throughout Australia where he talks with students about poetry and soccer, which he has loved since childhood.  He has also performed in the United Kingdom, USA, Singapore, Canada, Croatia, Spain, Vietnam, Germany, The Netherlands and the Czech Republic.

He has also written nine travel books based on his cycling adventures throughout Europe, including the hugely-successful, 'baguettes and bicycles'. His other travel books include 'Cycling North', tracing a 4000-kilometre bicycle journey from Marseille, France to Bergen, Norway, and 'Cycling South', following his trek from the Highlands of Scotland to the Islands of the Mediterranean (Sardinia and Corsica). Herrick also writes cycling articles for The Guardian newspaper (Australia).He lives in Katoomba in the Blue Mountains with his wife, Cathie. They have two adult sons named Jack and Joe.

Books

Herrick's books include fiction novels, poetry collections, and novels in verse.  Titles include:
 How to Repaint a Life (University of Queensland Press, 2021) 
 Zoe, Max and the Bicycle Bus (University of Queensland Press, 2020) The Bogan Mondrian (University of Queensland Press, 2018) Another Night in Mullet Town (University of Queensland Press, 2016) Bleakboy and Hunter Stand Out in the Rain (University of Queensland Press, 2014) Pookie Aleera Is Not My Boyfriend (University of Queensland Press, 2012) Black Painted Fingernails (Allen & Unwin, 2011) Slice: Juicy Moments from My Impossible Life (Random House, 2010) Untangling Spaghetti (University of Queensland Press, 2009) Rhyming Boy (University of Queensland Press, 2008) Cold Skin (Allen & Unwin, 2007) Lonesome Howl (Allen & Unwin, 2006) Naked Bunyip Dancing (Allen & Unwin, 2005) By the River (Allen & Unwin, 2004) Do-Wrong Ron (Allen & Unwin, 2003) Tom Jones Saves the World (University of Queensland Press, 2002) Love Poems and Leg Spinners (University of Queensland Press, 2001) The Simple Gift (University of Queensland Press, 2000) The Spangled Drongo (University of Queensland Press, 1999) A Place Like This (University of Queensland Press, 1998) Poetry to the Rescue (University of Queensland Press, 1998) My Life, My Love, My Lasagne (University of Queensland Press, 1997) Love, Ghosts and Nose Hair (University of Queensland Press, 1996) The Sound of Chopping (Five Islands Press, 1994) Water Bombs (University of Queensland Press, 1992) Caboolture'' (Five Islands Press, 1990)

References

The Blue Between

External links
 Steven Herrick's website
http://poetryfootballtravel.blogspot.com/

1958 births
Australian children's writers
Australian poets
Living people
People from Katoomba, New South Wales
Writers from Brisbane
University of Queensland alumni